WECW (107.7 FM, "107-7") is a radio station broadcasting an Alternative - Top 40 (CHR) hybrid format. It is licensed to Elmira, New York, United States.  The station is owned by Elmira College.

References

External links

Contemporary hit radio stations in the United States
ECW